Mimosa nothacacia is a species of plant in the family Fabaceae. It is found in Ecuador and Peru.

References

nothacacia
Flora of Peru
Vulnerable plants
Taxonomy articles created by Polbot